Municipal elections were held in Alberta, Canada on Monday, October 21, 2013. Mayors (reeves), councillors (aldermen), and trustees were elected to office in 16 of the 17 cities, all 108 towns, all 93 villages, all 5 specialized municipalities, all 64 municipal districts, 3 of the 8 improvement districts, and the advisory councils of the 3 special areas. The City of Lloydminster is on the Saskatchewan schedule (quadrennial), and held elections on October 24, 2012, while 5 improvement districts (Nos. 12, 13, 24, 25, and 349) have no councils and are led solely by the Minister of Municipal Affairs. Since the 2010 municipal elections, portions of Lac La Biche County and the Regional Municipality of Wood Buffalo formed Improvement District No. 349, and the villages of New Norway and Tilley were dissolved. From 1968 to 2013, provincial legislation has required every municipality to hold elections every three years. The Alberta Legislative Assembly passed a bill on December 5, 2012, amending the Local Authorities Election Act. Starting with the 2013 elections, officials are elected for a four-year term, and municipal elections are moved to a four-year cycle.

Cities 
The following are the elections for all Alberta cities.
Bold indicates elected, and incumbents are italicized.

Airdrie 
Citizens of Airdrie will elect six at large councillors. No mayoral election will be held due to Peter Brown being acclaimed.

Mayoral race

Brooks 
Citizens of Brooks will elect one mayor and six at large councillors.

Mayoral race

Mayoral by-election (held January 18, 2016)

Calgary 

In the 2013 elections, the citizens of Calgary elected one mayor, 14 councillors (one from each of 14 wards), the seven Calgary School District trustees (each representing 2 of 14 wards), and five of the seven Calgary Catholic School District trustees (each representing 2 of 14 wards).

Camrose 
Citizens of Camrose will elect one mayor and eight at large councillors.

Mayoral race

Cold Lake 
Citizens of Cold Lake will elect six at large councillors. No mayoral election will be held due to Craig Copeland being acclaimed.

Mayoral race

Edmonton 

In the 2013 elections, the citizens of Edmonton elected one mayor, 12 councillors (one from each of 12 wards), seven of the nine Edmonton Public Schools trustees (one from each of nine wards), and the seven Edmonton Catholic School District trustees (one from each of seven wards).

Fort Saskatchewan 
Citizens of Fort Saskatchewan will elect one mayor and six at large councillors.

Mayoral race

Grande Prairie 
Citizens of Grande Prairie will elect one mayor and eight at large councillors.

Mayoral race

Lacombe 
Citizens of Lacombe will elect one mayor and six at large councillors.

Mayoral race

Leduc 
Citizens of Leduc will elect one mayor and six at large aldermen (councillors).

Mayoral race

Lethbridge 

In the 2013 elections, the citizens of Lethbridge elected one mayor, eight councillors (all at large), the seven Lethbridge School District No. 51 trustees, and five of the Holy Spirit Roman Catholic Separate Regional Division No. 4's nine trustees (as Ward 2). This election marks a change of title for council members from "alderman" to "councillor".

Medicine Hat 
Citizens of Medicine Hat will elect one mayor and eight at large councillors.

Mayoral race

Red Deer 

In the 2013 elections, the citizens of Red Deer elected one mayor, eight councillors (all at large), the seven Red Deer School District No. 104 trustees (at large), and five of the Red Deer Catholic Regional Division No. 39's seven trustees (as Red Deer Ward). They also voted to not implement a ward system in a plebiscite.

Spruce Grove 
Citizens of Spruce Grove will elect one mayor and six at large aldermen (councillors).

Mayoral race

St. Albert 
Citizens of St. Albert will elect one mayor and six at large councillors.

Mayoral race

Wetaskiwin 
Citizens of Wetaskiwin will elect one mayor and six at large aldermen (councillors).

Mayoral race

Towns 
The following are the elections for Alberta towns with a population over 5,000.
Bold indicates elected, and incumbents are italicized.

Banff 
Citizens of Banff will elect one mayor and six at large councillors.

Mayoral race

Beaumont 
Citizens of Beaumont will elect one mayor and six at large councillors.

Mayoral race

Blackfalds 
Citizens of Blackfalds will elect one mayor and six at large councillors.

Mayoral race

Bonnyville 
Citizens of Bonnyville will elect one mayor and six at large councillors.

Mayoral race

Canmore 
Citizens of Canmore will elect one mayor and six at large councillors.

Mayoral race

Chestermere 
Citizens of Chestermere will elect six at large councillors. No mayoral election will be held due to Patricia Matthews being acclaimed.

Mayoral race

Coaldale 
Citizens of Coaldale will elect one mayor and six at large councillors.

Mayoral race

Cochrane 
Citizens of Cochrane will elect one mayor and six at large councillors.

Mayoral race

Morgan Justice Nagel was also elected as the youngest of the six councillors, of 13 candidates, becoming the youngest councillor in Cochrane at 23 years old.

Devon 
Citizens of Devon will elect one mayor and six at large councillors.

Mayoral race

Drayton Valley 
Citizens of Drayton Valley will elect one mayor and six at large councillors.

Mayoral race

Drumheller 
Citizens of Drumheller will elect six at large councillors. No mayoral election will be held due to Terry Yemen being acclaimed.

Mayoral race

Edson 
Citizens of Edson will elect one mayor and six at large councillors.

Mayoral race

High River 
Citizens of High River will elect one mayor and six at large councillors.

Mayoral race

Hinton 
Citizens of Hinton will elect one mayor and six at large councillors.

Mayoral race

Innisfail 
Citizens of Innisfail will elect six at large councillors. No mayoral election will be held due to Brian Spiller being acclaimed.

Mayoral race

Morinville 
Citizens of Morinville will elect one mayor and six at large councillors.

Mayoral race

Okotoks 
Citizens of Okotoks will elect one mayor and six at large councillors.

Mayoral race

Olds 
Citizens of Olds will elect one mayor and six at large councillors.

Mayoral race

Peace River
Citizens of Peace River will elect one mayor and six at large councillors.

Mayoral race

Ponoka
Citizens of Ponoka will elect one mayor and six at large councillors.

Mayoral race

Redcliff 
Citizens of Redcliff will elect one mayor and six at large councillors.

Mayoral race

Rocky Mountain House 
Citizens of Rocky Mountain House will elect one mayor and six at large councillors.

Mayoral race

Slave Lake 
Citizens of Slave Lake will elect six at large councillors. No mayoral election will be held due to Tyler Warman being elected with no opposition.

Mayoral race

Stettler 
Citizens of Sttetler will elect six at large councillors. No mayoral election will be held due to Dick Richards being elected with no opposition.

Mayoral race

Stony Plain 
Citizens of Stony Plain will elect six at large councillors. No mayoral election will be held due to William Choy being acclaimed.

Mayoral race

St. Paul 
Citizens of St. Paul will elect six at large councillors. No mayoral election will be held due to Glenn Andersen being elected with no opposition.

Mayoral race

Strathmore 
Citizens of Strathmore will elect one mayor and six at large councillors.

Mayoral race

Sylvan Lake 
Citizens of Sylvan Lake will elect one mayor and six at large councillors.

Mayoral race

Taber 
Citizens of Taber will elect one mayor and six at large councillors.

Mayoral race

Vegreville 
Citizens of Vegreville will elect one mayor and six at large councillors.

Mayoral race

Wainwright 
Citizens of Wainwright will elect six at large councillors. No mayoral election will be held due to Brian Bethune being elected with no opposition.

Mayoral race

Whitecourt 
Citizens of Whitecourt will elect one mayor and six at large councillors.

Mayoral race

Bold indicates elected, and incumbents are italicized.

Specialized municipalities 
The following are the elections for Alberta specialized municipalities with a population over 5,000, which include the urban service areas of Fort McMurray and Sherwood Park.

Crowsnest Pass 
In the 2013 elections, the citizens of Crowsnest Pass will elect one mayor, and six at large councillors.

Mayoral race

Mackenzie County 
In the 2013 elections, the citizens of Mackenzie County were to elect ten councillors (one from each of ten wards). As six of them were acclaimed, citizens of wards 1, 3, 7 and 9 will elect the remaining four councillors.

Strathcona County 

In the 2013 elections, the citizens of Strathcona County elected one mayor, eight councillors (one from each of eight wards), five of the Elk Island Public Schools Regional Division No. 14's nine trustees (three from Sherwood Park, one from Strathcona County north, and one from Strathcona County south), and four of the Elk Island Catholic Separate Regional Division No. 41's seven trustees (supporters in Sherwood Park).

Wood Buffalo 

In the 2013 elections, the citizens of the Regional Municipality of Wood Buffalo elected one mayor, ten councillors (from four wards), the five Fort McMurray Public School District trustees (in Fort McMurray), five of the Northland School Division No. 61's 22 school boards (outside Fort McMurray, three or five trustees each), and the five Fort McMurray Catholic School District trustees (in Fort McMurray).

Municipal districts 
The following are the election results for Alberta municipal districts (counties) with a population over 5,000 and have an elected mayor or reeve position.
Bold indicates elected, and incumbents are italicized.

Bonnyville No. 87 
Citizens of the Municipal District of Bonnyville No. 87 will elect six councillors from six wards. 
 
Reeve race

Brazeau County 
Citizens of Brazeau County will elect six councillors from six divisions. 
 
Reeve race

Lac La Biche County 
Citizens of Lac La Biche County will elect seven councillors from seven wards. 
 
Mayoral race

Red Deer County 
Citizens of Red Deer County will elect six councillors from six divisions. No mayoral election will be held due to Jim Wood being acclaimed.

Mayoral race

St. Paul County No. 19 
Citizens of the County of St. Paul No. 19 will elect six councillors from six divisions. 
 
Mayoral race

Yellowhead County 
Citizens of Yellowhead County elected eight councillors from eight wards. 
 
Mayoral race

See also 
Alberta municipal censuses, 2013
Alberta municipal censuses, 2014
List of municipalities in Alberta

References